The North Macedonia national under-19 football team is the national under-19 football team of the Republic of North Macedonia and is controlled by the Football Federation of North Macedonia. The current manager is Shkumbin Arsllani. The current tournament is the 2020 UEFA European Under-19 Championship, in which only players born on 1 January 2001 or later are eligible to play.

2018 UEFA European Under-19 Football Championship qualification

Group 5 (qualifying round)

2020 UEFA European Under-19 Championship qualification

Group 11 (qualifying round)

2022 UEFA European Under-19 Championship qualification

Group 7

Players

Current squad
 The following players were called up for the 2023 UEFA European Under-19 Championship qualification matches.
 Match dates: 17, 20 and 23 November 2022
 Caps and goals correct as of:''' 25 October 2022, after the match against .

Recent call-ups
The following players were called up within the last twelve months and remain eligible for selection.

References

See also 
 Macedonia national football team
 Macedonia national under-21 football team
 Macedonia national under-17 football team
 European Under-19 Football Championship

Under-19
European national under-19 association football teams
Youth football in North Macedonia